Villa Guerrero may refer to one of several places in Mexico:

Villa Guerrero, Coahuila
Villa Guerrero, Jalisco
Villa Guerrero, State of Mexico

See also
Guerrero (disambiguation)